The territorial extent covered by the term Ulster may vary, reflecting the prevalent deep political and cultural divisions.

The province of Ulster, one of the historic four provinces on the island of Ireland – comprising nine counties, six in Northern Ireland and three in the Republic of Ireland.
Northern Ireland is sometimes referred to as Ulster, particularly by the unionist community, in this sense comprising the six UK-ruled counties only.

Political and paramilitary organisations, parties and movements having "Ulster" as part of their name are almost invariably on the Unionist side; military and police units having such names are often accused of a pro-Unionist bias. That is, however, not necessarily the case with names in other spheres including "Ulster". For example, Ulster sports associations and teams often form part of an all-Ireland structure and thus, while not overtly political, are favourably regarded by Irish Nationalists.

Flags

 The divergent meanings of "Ulster" are reflected in divergent flags:
 The Flag of Ulster which represents the whole of the historic province of Ulster
 The Ulster Banner, used from 1953 to 1972 as the banner of the former Government of Northern Ireland. Today it is still used by some Northern Ireland sports teams.

Linguistics

Ulster Irish – the variety of the Irish language spoken in the province of Ulster.
Ulster Scots, the variety of Scots spoken in parts of the province of Ulster.
Mid Ulster English – the dialect of most people in the province of Ulster, including those in the two main cities.

Sociological terms

 Ulster-Scots, an ethnic group descended from mainly Lowland Scots who settled in the Province of Ulster.
 Ulster Scots eXperience – band of musicians who perform music from the Ulster-Scots tradition
 Ulster-Scots Folk Orchestra
 Ulster-Scots Agency (Tha Boord o Ulstèr-Scotch), cross-border body promoting this dialect and its attendant culture.
 The Ulster-Scot – publication of the above
 Ulsterman/Ulsterwoman – in principle referring to any inhabitant of Ulster, in practice mainly used by the Unionist community.

Medieval history
 
The Ulster Cycle – one of the four great cycles of Irish mythology, a series of legends surrounding the Red Branch Knights.
 The Annals of Ulster – a chronicle of medieval Ireland.
Red Hand of Ulster – symbol derived from Medieval history/myth and prominent in flags and coats of arms.
 Kings of Ulster
 Earl of Ulster – title created several times, since 1205, in the Peerages of Ireland and the United Kingdom.
Ulster King of Arms – dealing with heraldic issues in the province, an office established in 1552 by King Edward VI.

17th century history

The Plantation of Ulster – an early 17th-century process of colonisation in the Province of Ulster in the reign of James I of England.

Early 20th century politics, military, police and paramilitary
 
 Ulster Covenant – 1912 mass petition against the Home Rule Bill
 Ulster 1912 – a Kipling poem supporting that Covenant
 Ulster Volunteers – founded in 1912 to block Home Rule for Ireland
 Ulster Volunteer Force (UVF) – later development of the above
Ulster Division/36th (Ulster) Division – formed from UVF men and fought at France during World War I
Ulster Tower – war memorial at Thiepval, France, commemorating the above
 The Royal Ulster Rifles, name given to the former Royal Irish Rifles in the British Army in 1921, following the proclamation of the Irish Free State.
Ulster Special Constabulary (USC), a reserve police force in Northern Ireland, formed in 1920 and disbanded in 1970.
Ulster Defence Volunteers/Ulster Home Guard – recruited by the Government of Northern Ireland during World War II.

Later 20th century/current politics, military, police and paramilitary

 Ulster loyalism – a militant Unionist ideology held mostly by Protestants in Northern Ireland,
Ulster Volunteer Force (UVF) – paramilitary loyalist group founded in 1966 and claiming the heritage of the earlier UVF
Ulster Defence Association – another loyalist paramilitary group
Ulster Democratic Party (UDP)/Ulster Loyalist Democratic Party/ New Ulster Political Research Group – political parties and groupings at different times linked to the above.
 Ulster Young Militants youth of the above
 Ulster Defence Regiment – formed in 1970 to replace the USC (Ulster Special Constabulary).
 Royal Ulster Constabulary – Northern Ireland police force often accused of pro-Unionist bias, merged into the Police Service of Northern Ireland following the Good Friday Agreement
 The Ulster Unionist Party (UUP), the more moderate of the two main unionist political parties in Northern Ireland
 Free Presbyterian Church of Ulster, founded in 1951 by the cleric and politician Ian Paisley
 Ulster nationalism – school of thought seeking the independence of Northern Ireland from the UK without becoming part of the Republic of Ireland.
 Ulster Independence Movement – supporting the above.
 The Ulster Third Way – supporting the above.
 Ulster Loyalist Central Co-ordinating Committee/Ulster Independence Party/Ulster Independence Association – political party and paramilitary organization in the 1970s and 1980s
 Ulster Resistance – 1980s paramilitary
 Ulster Clubs – Unionist organisation in the 1980s
 Ulster Movement for Self-Determination – minor movement which emerged from the above
 Love Ulster – umbrella unionist victims' group
 British Army:
 152nd (Ulster) Transport Regiment – in the UK Territorial Army.
 107 (Ulster) Brigade
40 (Ulster) Signal Regiment
206 (Ulster) Battery, Royal Artillery
 Ulster Workers Council – a Loyalist workers' organisation
 Ulster Workers' Council Strike – 1974 general strike by the above, against the proposed power-sharing Sunningdale Agreement
 Ulster Protestant Volunteers/Ulster Constitution Defence Committee – 1960s paramilitaries
 United Ulster Unionist Party – political party between 1975 and 1982.
 Ulster Army Council 1973 coordination of Loyalist paramilitaries
 Ulster Project – promoting reconciliation

Sporting
Ulster rugby union team
Ulster Schools Cup
Ulster Senior Cup
 Ulster Junior Cup
 Ulster Senior League
Ulster GAA teams which compete in the Gaelic football and Hurling in the Railway cup
 Ulster Cup in Association football
 Ulster Senior League (Association football)
 Ulster Senior Club Football Championship in Gaelic football
 Ulster Senior Football Championship in Gaelic football
 Ulster Hockey Union
 Ulster Senior League (Men's Hockey)
 Ulster Shield – competition for ladies' hockey teams
 Ulster Grand Prix, motorcycle road race
 Ulster Senior Hurling Championship
 Ulster Intermediate Club Hurling Championship

Institutions and companies
Culture of Ulster
UTV, the ITV broadcaster for Northern Ireland (also widely watched in the Republic of Ireland), was known as Ulster Television from its inception on 31 October 1959 to 4 June 1993.
Radio Ulster, a BBC radio station based in Belfast
 Good Morning Ulster – program of the above
The Ulster Hospital in Dundonald, known colloquially as "the Ulster"
The University of Ulster
 The University of Ulster at Coleraine
The Ulster Museum
 Ulster Folk and Transport Museum in Cultra
 Ulster American Folk Park, open-air museum in Castletown, County Tyrone
The Ulster Bank
The Ulster Orchestra
 Ulster Hall – Concert Hall
 Ulster Transport Authority
 Ulster Railways (disambiguation)
 Ulster Railway – historical (19th Century company)
Ulsterbus – public transport operator
Ulster Teachers' Union
Ulster Way – series of walking routes
Ulster Canal – 19th Century, presently disused
Ulster Herald – weekly newspaper in Omagh

Constituencies
 Mid Ulster (Assembly constituency)
 Mid Ulster (UK Parliament constituency)
 Connacht–Ulster (European Parliament constituency)

Place-names elsewhere, originally named in honour of the Irish province

Ulster, Pennsylvania, United States of America
Ulster County, New York, United States of America
Ulster, New York, a town in Ulster County, NY
Ulster Park, New York, United States of America
New Ulster, the long-defunct name of the northern part of New Zealand
Ulster and Delaware Railroad, in New York State
Delaware and Ulster Railroad, in New York State
New Ulster, a province in New Zealand (1841–53)

Other

 An ulster (lower case) – a type of overcoat manufactured by the Ulster Overcoat Company in Belfast, which Sherlock Holmes is depicted as wearing
An Ulster fry, a dish of various fried meats and breads popular throughout the province of Ulster
 Ulster, a Brazilian punk band from the 1980s.